Osmeña may refer to:

People
As a family name in the Philippines:
 Sergio Osmeña (1878–1961), President
 Sergio Osmeña, Jr. (1918–1984), Senator
 John Henry Osmeña (1935–2021), Senator
 Emilio Mario Osmeña (1938–2021), Governor of Cebu
 Sergio Osmeña III (1943– ), Senator
 Tomas Osmeña (1948– ), Mayor of Cebu City

Other uses
 Sergio Osmeña Sr., Zamboanga del Norte, a municipality in the Philippines
 Osmeña pearl, a jewelry product derived from the chambered Nautilus
 Osmeña Boulevard, a major arterial thoroughfare in Cebu City, Philippines
 Osmeña Highway, a major thoroughfare in Metro Manila, Philippines
 Bando Osmeña – Pundok Kauswagan, a regional political party run by the Osmeña family of Cebu